Derbyshire County Cricket Club in 1896 represents the cricket season when the English club Derbyshire had been playing for twenty five years. It was their second season in the County Championship and they came seventh.

1896 season
 
Derbyshire played 16 games in the County Championship, one match against MCC and one against the touring Australians. They won five matches in the County Championship and six matches altogether.  Brewer's son Sydney Evershed was in his sixth season  as captain. William Storer was top scorer, as well as keeping wicket and bowling to take 15 wickets. John Hulme took most wickets with 77 in the County Championship.

In a season marked by a number of high scores, with centuries both for and against Derbyshire Storer and George Davidson produced notable batting performances during the season. Davidson made 274 against Lancashire at Manchester which remains the Derbyshire individual batting record. In the same innings  Chatterton and Storer also scored centuries. Against Yorkshire Storer hit centuries in each innings—a feat performed previously only by W. G. Grace, A. E. Stoddart and George Brann, giving him a season's batting average of over 57.  Bagshaw added a third century against Yorkshire in the same match.

Of those who made their debuts in the season, Thomas Gould and Henry Curgenven also played in 1897. John Purdy and Charles Middleton played more seasons, but only occasionally. Walter Butterfield played only two matches in 1896 and Frank Bingham just one.

Matches

{| class="wikitable" width="100%"
! bgcolor="#efefef" colspan=6 | List of  matches
|- bgcolor="#efefef"
!No.
!Date
!V
!Result 
!Margin
!Notes
|-
|1
|14 May 1896 
|SurreyAt County Ground, Derby
|bgcolor="#FF0000"|Lost
|Innings and 15 runs 
| Hayward 229 
|-
|2
|18 May 1896  
|Nottinghamshire<small>At Trent Bridge
|bgcolor="#FF0000"|Lost
|7 wickets 
| Gunn 135 
|-
|3
|25 May 1896 
|HampshireAt County Ground, Southampton
|bgcolor="#00FF00"|Won
|7 wickets 
| Ward 113 
|-
|4
|28 May 1896 
|MCCAt Lord's
|bgcolor="#00FF00"|Won
|1 wicket
| W Attewell 5-38; G Porter 5-50 
|-
|5
|04 Jun 1896 
|SurreyAt Kennington Oval
|bgcolor="#FF0000"|Lost
|Innings and 57 runs 
| R Abel 109; G Lohmann  6-51 
|-
|6
|08 Jun 1896 
|Lancashire<small>At County Ground, Derby
|bgcolor="#FF0000"|Lost
|37 runs 
| JJ Hulme 6-57; A Mold 5-58 and 7-46; G Davidson 5-49 
|-
|7
|15 Jun 1896 
|Nottinghamshire<small>At County Ground, Derby
|bgcolor="#FFCC00"|Drawn
|
 | Gunn 207*; Hardstaffe 8-53 
|-
|8
|25 Jun 1896 
|Yorkshire<small>At County Ground, Derby
|bgcolor="#FFCC00"|Drawn
| 
| W Storer 100 and 100*; H Bagshaw  115
|-
|9
|29 Jun 1896 
|LeicestershireAt Grace Road, Leicestershire
|bgcolor="#00FF00"|Won
|Innings and 147 runs 
| W Storer 142; G Davidson 6-53 
|-
|10
|02 Jul 1896 
|Yorkshire Bramall Lane, Sheffield  
|bgcolor="#FF0000"|Lost
|9 wickets 
| Denton 113; W Storer 122; JJ Hulme 5-80; S Haigh 6-45 and 6-70 
|-
|11
|06 Jul 1896 
|Leicestershire<small>At County Ground, Derby
|bgcolor="#FFCC00"|Drawn
| 
| H Bagshaw  121; Pougher 114 
|-
|12
|13 Jul 1896 
|WarwickshireAt County Ground, Derby
|bgcolor="#00FF00"|Won
|10 wickets 
| R Lilley 132 and 6-46; G Davidson 5-62; JJ Hulme 7-44
|-
|13
|20 Jul 1896 
|Australians At County Ground, Derby
|bgcolor="#FFCC00"|Drawn
| 
| Trott 141; Donnan 167; Hill 130; G Giffen 5-123
|-
|14
|23 Jul 1896 
|Essex At County Ground, Leyton
|bgcolor="#FFCC00"|Drawn
| 
| W Chatterton  111 
|-
|15
|03 Aug 1896 
|HampshireAt County Ground, Derby
|bgcolor="#00FF00"|Won
|8 wickets 
| Kitchener 6-59 
|-
|16
|10 Aug 1896 
|LancashireAt Old Trafford, Manchester
|bgcolor="#FFCC00"|Drawn
| 
|W Chatterton  104; G Davidson 274; W Storer 116; J Briggs 6–185; JJ Hulme 5-94 
|-
|17
|17 Aug 1896 
|Essex<small>At County Ground, Derby
|bgcolor="#FF0000"|Lost
|201 runs 
| JJ Hulme 6-98; Bull 5-68
|-
|18
|24 Aug 1896 
|WarwickshireAt Edgbaston
|bgcolor="#FFCC00"|Drawn
| 
| G Davidson 8-70
|-

Statistics

County Championship batting averages

Additionally C Middleton and  FM Bingham  played in the non County Championship match against MCC. Middleton failed to score, but Bingham made seventeen runs in what was his only match for the club.

County Championship bowling averages

Wicket Keeping

See also
Derbyshire County Cricket Club seasons
1896 English cricket season

References

1896 in English cricket
Derbyshire County Cricket Club seasons
English cricket seasons in the 19th century